Pierre-Yves Melançon is a Canadian politician and a City Councillor in Montreal, Quebec.

Background

He holds a degree in Political Science.

City Councillor

Melançon was a member of the Montreal Citizens' Movement.

He successfully ran as City Councillor in the district of Mont-Royal in 1982.  He was re-elected in 1986.  Disappointed with the party's gradual shift to the center, he quit the RCM.  In December 1989, with three other councillors, he founded the Democratic Coalition of Montreal.

Mayoral Candidate

In 1990, he was the mayoral candidate for the Democratic Coalition and the council candidate for the Côte-des-Neiges.  He lost both races.  In June 1992 he left the Coalition.

Political Comeback

In 1994 he was re-elected to the City Council as a Vision Montreal candidate, representing the district of Côte-des-Neiges.  He was re-elected in 1998, but lost re-election in 2001 against Francine Sénécal.

Retirement from Political Office

Melançon has been Vice-President of Vision Montréal since 2006.

Footnotes

Living people
Montreal city councillors
Year of birth missing (living people)